Batcombe may refer to:
 Batcombe, Dorset
 Batcombe, Somerset